Friendly Fascism may refer to:
Friendly Fascism: The New Face of Power in America, 1980 book by Bertram Gross
Friendly Fa$cism, an album by Consolidated
 A slogan from Vermin Supreme, a political clown and candidate